"Post Mortem" is the twentieth episode of the eighth season of House and the 175th overall. It aired on May 7, 2012 on FOX.

Plot
The team takes on the case of Dr. Peter Treiber, a pathologist at Princeton-Plainsboro Teaching Hospital suddenly begins slicing his own scalp open during an autopsy. Treiber  knows too much about the hospital staff to trust any of the physicians, thus adding to the drama. The only person he does respect is House.

Wilson has decided not to wait around Princeton-Plainsboro for his test results. He buys a new car and convinces House, by threatening to drug him and take him along anyway, to go on an unannounced road trip with him. Leaving their phones behind, this results in House's "mysterious" disappearance. House decides to take advantage of Wilson's condition to get some sympathy from the people they meet.

With House absent, the team has to figure out how to treat Treiber while making him believe that House is calling all the shots. It becomes even more difficult when it turns out that the patient has a grudge against Chase, and this just forces Chase to confront his own choices in life.

Reception
The Onion's AV Club gave this episode a B rating, while Lisa Palmer of TV Fanatic gave it a 4.8/5.0 rating.

References

External links

"Post Mortem" at Fox.com
Medical review of "Post Mortem"

House (season 8) episodes
2012 American television episodes